Faaji FM is a Nigerian radio station. It is owned by Daar Communications, a communication firm founded by Raymond Dokpesi. Faaji FM officially started full transmission on December 1, 2012, with  Managing Director radio services Daar Communications, Kenny Ogungbe kicking off the transmission.

See also 
 Agidigbo Fm 88.7, Ibadan

References

Radio stations in Lagos